Acharne may refer to:

 Acharne, Greece, a suburb of Athens
 Acharrae, an ancient town of Thessaly